Philip Emeagwali (born 23 August 1954) is a Nigerian computer scientist. He won the 1989 Gordon Bell Prize for price-performance in high-performance computing applications, in an oil reservoir modeling calculation using a novel mathematical formulation and implementation. He is known for making controversial claims about his achievements that are disputed by the scientific community.

Biography
Philip Emeagwali was born in Akure, Nigeria on 23 August 1954. He was raised in Onitsha in the South Eastern part of Nigeria. His early schooling was suspended in 1967 as a result of the Nigerian Civil War. At age 13, he served in the Biafran army. After the war he completed high-school equivalence through self-study.

Later on he married Dale Brown Emeagwali, an African-American microbiologist.

Education
He traveled to the United States to study under a scholarship following completion of a correspondence course at the University of London. He received a bachelor's degree in mathematics from Oregon State University in 1977. He later moved to Washington D.C., receiving in 1986 a master's degree from George Washington University in ocean and marine engineering, and a second master's in applied mathematics from the University of Maryland. Next magazine suggested that Emeagwali claimed to have further degrees. During this time, he worked as a civil engineer at the Bureau of Land Reclamation in Wyoming.

Court case and the denial of degree
Emeagwali studied for a Ph.D. degree from the University of Michigan from 1987 through 1991. His thesis was not accepted by a committee of internal and external examiners and thus he was not awarded the degree. Emeagwali filed a court challenge, stating that the decision was a violation of his civil rights and that the university had discriminated against him in several ways because of his race. The court challenge was dismissed, as was an appeal to the Michigan state Court of Appeals.

Supercomputing
Emeagwali received the 1989 Gordon Bell Prize for an application of the CM-2 massively-parallel computer. The application used computational fluid dynamics for oil-reservoir modeling. He received a prize in "price/performance" category, with a performance figure of about 400 Mflops/$1M. The winner in the  "performance" category was also the winner of the Price/performance category, but unable to receive two prizes: Mobil Research and Thinking Machines used the CM-2 for seismic data processing and achieved the higher ratio of 500 Mflops/$1M. The judges decided on one award per entry. His method involved each microprocessor communicating with six neighbors.

Emeagwali's simulation was the first program to apply a pseudo-time approach to reservoir modeling. He was cited by Bill Clinton as an example of what Nigerians can achieve when given the opportunity and is frequently featured in popular press articles for Black History Month.

Debunked controversial claims 
Emeagwali has made several controversial claims about his achievements that are disputed by the scientific community. His claim of being a father of the Internet, of having invented the Connection Machine, of possessing 41   patented inventions, of winning "the Nobel Prize of Computing" and of being a "doctor" and/or "professor" have been conclusively debunked with widely documented evidence. Speaking during a visit to Switzerland in April 2009, Mr. Emeagwali said he was the first to program a hypercube "to solve a grand challenge defined as the 20 gold-ring problems in computing. That discovery, in part, inspired the reinvention of supercomputers as an Internet." He claimed that by his effort, he was able to set three world records and improve on Newton's Second Law of Motion.

Accolades 
 Price/performance–1989 Gordon Bell Prize, IEEE ($1,000 prize)

Selected publications 
 Emeagwali, P. (2003). How do we reverse the brain drain. speech given at. 
 Emeagwali, P. (1997). Can Nigeria leapfrog into the information age. In World Igbo Congress. New York: August.

References

External links

emeagwali.com – Emeagwali's autobiography.
Digital Giants: Philip Emeagwali (BBC)
Biography of Emeagwali from IEEE (Archive, as of May 26, 2009).

1954 births
George Washington University School of Engineering and Applied Science alumni
Living people
Oregon State University alumni
Scientific computing researchers
People from Onitsha
People of the Nigerian Civil War
Nigerian computer scientists
20th-century Nigerian mathematicians
Nigerian engineers
Igbo scientists
Nigerian emigrants to the United States
American people of Igbo descent